Kyle Davis may refer to:

 Kyle Davis (actor) (born 1978), American actor
 Kyle Davis (American football) (born 1952), former American football center
 Kyle Davis (table tennis) (born 1989), Australian table tennis player
 Kyle Davis (soccer), American soccer player
 Kyle Davis (basketball) for Rio Grande Valley Vipers
 Kyle Davis (golfer) in Pennsylvania Open Championship
 Kyle Davis, dancer at the Pacific Northwest Ballet

See also
 Kyle Davies (disambiguation)